The 2020 Chinese Football Association Cup, officially known as the Yanjing Beer 2020 Chinese FA Cup (Chinese: 燕京啤酒2020中国足球协会杯) for sponsorship reasons, was the 22nd edition of the Chinese FA Cup. It was postponed following the COVID-19 pandemic in mainland China. On 2 September 2020, Chinese Football Association announced that Chinese FA Cup would resume on 18 September 2020.

The defending champions, Chinese Super League side Shanghai Greenland Shenhua, were eliminated by Guangzhou R&F in the first round on 18 September.

Schedule
The schedule is as follows.

First round
The draw for the first round took place on 2 September 2020.

Second round
The draw for the second round took place on 30 October 2020. The eight CSL clubs which advanced to this round face the top eight clubs of the 2020 China League One.

Quarter-finals
The draw for the quarter-finals took place on 30 October 2020.

Semi-finals
The draw for the semi-finals took place on 30 October 2020.

1st leg

2nd leg

1–1 on aggregate. Jiangsu Suning won 4–2 on penalties.

Shandong Luneng Taishan won 6–0 on aggregate.

Final
The draw for the final took place on 30 October 2020.

References

2020
2020 in Chinese football
2020 Asian domestic association football cups
Association football events postponed due to the COVID-19 pandemic